Yonis may refer to:

Somali name 
 Mohamed Yonis
 Yonis Farah

Other 
 Yonis Reuf (or Yûnis Reuf)

See also 
 Yoni, a Hindu symbol
 Yonas Mekuria (sometimes misspelled as Yonis Mekuria)